Whistleblower is a two-part Irish television IFTA-winning fact-based drama, broadcast on RTÉ One for two consecutive nights in 2008, which focuses on the Michael Neary scandal that first erupted in the 1990s. Neary, a retired Irish consultant obstetrician and gynaecologist, gained notoriety when it was discovered that he had performed what was considered an inordinate number of caesarian hysterectomies during his time at Our Lady of Lourdes Hospital in Drogheda, County Louth.

Whistleblower follows the obstacles encountered by a midwife Louise (Emma Stansfield) as she blows the whistle on Neary (Stanley Townsend)'s irregular obstetric practices. The series was written by Rob Heyland, directed by Dermot Boyd, produced by Siobhán Bourke and Peter Norris and researched by Sheila Ahern. The first episode, broadcast at 21:30 on 31 August 2008, drew in a third of the available audience across all platforms.

Production
The series was based upon the activities of Dr. Michael Neary, a former consultant obstetrician and gynaecologist, who was considered to have performed an inordinate number of caesarian hysterectomies during his time at Our Lady of Lourdes Hospital in Drogheda, County Louth. A subsequent inquiry found that Neary had carried out 188 peripartum over a period of 25 years, some on very young women of low parity. The average consultant obstetrician carries out five or six of these operations in their entire career.

Reception
The series' broadcast prompted the support group Patient Focus to renew its call on the Irish government for every woman affected by Neary's actions to be included in the Lourdes hospital redress scheme.

RTÉ were also criticised for airing the series too soon after the conclusion of Neary inquiry, and for making the in-depth script too "upsetting for" all those involved. The commissioning editor of drama with the national broadcaster, Jane Gogan, attempted to justify the broadcast, commenting that; "RTÉ hopes to convey to a wider audience the human cost of the injustices which were exposed, and to illustrate the power of the individual in affecting change".

Cast

 Emma Stansfield as Louise
 Stanley Townsend as Dr. Michael Neary
 Adrian Dunbar as Florence Wycherley
 Charlene McKenna as Karen
 Patrick Ryan as Sean
 Paul Meade as Dr. Muriston
 Ingrid Craigie as Shelagh Hodnett
 Sandra Ni Bhroin as Elaine
 Janice Byrne as Jacinta
 Michèle Forbes as Nuala 
 Simon Keogh as Brian 
 Catriona Lynch as Lauren
 Michael McElhatton as Miller
 Lise Ann McLaughlin as Frances
 Kathy Rose O'Brien as Marie
 Owen Roe as Dillon

Episodes

Awards

|-
| 2009 || Whistleblower || Best Single or Serial Drama || 
|-
|}

References

External links

 Official site

2008 Irish television series debuts
2008 Irish television series endings
Irish drama television series
Irish history television shows
RTÉ original programming